Killulagh is a civil parish in County Westmeath, Ireland.

Killulagh is one of 7 civil parishes in the barony of Delvin in the Province of Leinster.

Killulagh civil parish comprises 17 townlands, and the neighbouring civil parishes include: Delvin, Kilcumny and St. Feighin's (barony of Fore) to the north, Killaconnigan (barony of Lune, County Meath) to the east, Killagh, Killucan and Rathconnell (barony of Moyashel and Magheradernon) to the south and Kilpatrick (barony of Fore) to the west.

References

External links
Killulagh civil parish at the IreAtlas Townland Data Base
Killulagh civil parish at townlands.ie
Killulagh civil parish at The Placename Database of Ireland

Civil parishes of County Westmeath